Qiang (pronunciation: , English approximation:) is the Chinese term for spear. Due to its relative ease of manufacture, the spear in many variations was ubiquitous on the pre-modern Chinese battlefield. It is known as one of the four major weapons, along with the gun (staff), dao (sabre), and the jian (straight sword), called in this group "The King of Weapons".

Common features of the Chinese spear are the leaf-shaped blade and red horse-hair tassel lashed just below. The tassel shows elite troop status. It also serves a tactical purpose. When the spear is moving quickly, the addition of the tassel aids in blurring the vision of the opponent so that it is more difficult for them to grab the shaft of spear behind the head or tip. The tassel also served another purpose, to stop the flow of blood from the blade getting to the wooden shaft (the blood would make it slippery, or sticky when dried).

The length varied from around 2.5 meters long, increasing up to six meters. According to general Qi Jiguang, the Ming military categorized spears above 2.5 meters as short spears, 4 meters as long spears, and spears below 2.5 meters as spiked staffs, which were used more for hitting than stabbing.  Spears used in war are typically made of hardwood. 
Martial arts (wushu) spears are typically made of wax wood, a lighter and more flexible wood better suited for performance; these are called flower spears.

Many Chinese martial arts feature spear training in their curriculum. The conditioning provided by the spear technique is seen as invaluable and in many styles, it is the first weapons training introduced to students. Moreover, some schools of empty-handed fighting in China credit the spear technique as their foundation, notably Xingyiquan and Bajiquan.

In popular culture
 In the film Crouching Tiger, Hidden Dragon, Shu Lien uses a qiang while teaching Princess Jen.
 Kung Fu Hustle features Donut, the baker of Pigsty Alley, using qiangs when fighting the Harpists, two assassins sent by the Axe Gang.
 Shang-Chi and the Legend of the Ten Rings features qiangs of dragon scales being used by warriors of Ta Lo.

See also
Spear of Fuchai
Guandao

References

Chinese melee weapons
Spears
Events in wushu

ja:槍